Onion cake is a savory or sweet cake prepared using onion as a primary ingredient. Various onion cakes are consumed in Canada, China, Germany, Korea, Switzerland, Wales and in other countries. Several types and varieties of onion cakes exist, including laobing, pajeon, the scallion pancake, Edmonton-style green onion cake, teisen nionod and zwiebelkuchen.

Overview
Onion cake is prepared using onion as a main ingredient along with other typical cake ingredients. The use of boiled onion can reduce the sharpness of the onion's flavor in onion cake. Potato or bacon may also be used as a main ingredient in onion cake. Additional ingredients can include cottage cheese and sour cream.  Various onion cakes are consumed in China, Germany, Switzerland, Wales and in other countries.

In Chinese cuisine, onion cake may be prepared using spring onion, (also referred to as scallion). A basic Chinese onion cake can consist of flour, lard, spring onion and salt.

Varieties

Edmonton-style green onion cake
A variant of the Chinese spring onion pancake popularized by chef Siu To has become the local specialty of Edmonton, Canada. Two variations exist: one with a typical pancake shape, and the other with a hole in the middle. To attributes the early popularity of his green onion cakes with the large number of Taiwanese expatriates in the area.

Laobing

Laobing is a pancake or unleavened flatbread in Chinese cuisine that is prepared with flour, water and salt. Scallions may be used as an additional primary ingredient, and scallions are sometimes served as a side dish with laobing.

Pajeon
Pajeon is a savory jeon (pancake) dish in Korean cuisine prepared with a batter of flour, eggs and green onions or leeks. Rice flour may also be used, along with additional ingredients, such as seafood, pork and beef. Dongnae pajeon is prepared using green onion and seafood.

Scallion pancake

A scallion pancake is a Chinese pancake or unleavened flatbread prepared using scallion as a primary ingredient. It is typically prepared using a dough, although some are prepared from a batter. The scallion pancake is a traditional food in Shanghai, China, and is a common dish throughout the country. In China, fresh scallions are typically used in the dish's preparation. The scallion may be fried before it is added to the dough.

Teisen nionod
Teisen nionod  is a Welsh onion cake prepared with onion, potato, butter, beef stock, salt and pepper.

Zwiebelkuchen
Zwiebelkuchen is a German onion cake or tart prepared with steamed onion, bacon, cream and caraway seeds on leavened or yeast dough.

See also

 List of cakes
 List of onion dishes

References

External links

 German Onion Cake. Epicurious.

Cakes
Onion-based foods